Sterling is a city in Rice County, Kansas, United States.  As of the 2020 census, the population of the city was 2,248.  Sterling is home to Sterling College.

History
For millennia, the land now known as Kansas was inhabited by Native Americans.  In 1803, most of modern Kansas was secured by the United States as part of the Louisiana Purchase.  In 1854, the Kansas Territory was organized, then in 1861 Kansas became the 34th U.S. state.  In 1867, Rice County was founded.

Sterling was originally called Peace, and under the latter name was founded in 1872.  In 1876, the name was changed to Sterling, by two brothers after their father Sterling Rosan.

In the 1890s, Jonathan S. Dillon sold groceries at his general store in Sterling.  Later in 1913, he opened his first J.S. Dillon Cash Food Market in Hutchinson.  Later he expanded into the Dillons grocery supermarket chain.

Historic places
 Charles K. Beckett House (NRHP), 210 West Main Street.
 Cooper Hall (NRHP), North Broadway Avenue.
 Shay Building (NRHP), 202 South Broadway Avenue.
 Sterling Carnegie Library (NRHP), 132 North Broadway Avenue.

Geography 
Sterling is located at  (38.210658, -98.204549).

Climate

Demographics

2010 census
As of the census of 2010, there were 2,328 people, 786 households, and 510 families living in the city. The racial makeup of the city was 93.1% White, 2.4% African American, 0.7% Native American, 0.6% Asian, 0.9% from other races, and 2.3% from two or more races. Hispanic or Latino of any race were 4.3% of the population.

There were 786 households, of which 27.9% had children under the age of 18 living with them, 52.7% were married couples living together, 8.9% had a female householder with no husband present, 3.3% had a male householder with no wife present, and 35.1% were non-families. 30.2% of all households were made up of individuals, and 14.8% had someone living alone who was 65 years of age or older. The average household size was 2.31 and the average family size was 2.89.

The median age in the city was 29.5 years. 18.9% of residents were under the age of 18; 26.9% were between the ages of 18 and 24; 16% were from 25 to 44; 22% were from 45 to 64; and 16.3% were 65 years of age or older. The gender makeup of the city was 50.2% male and 49.8% female.

2000 census
As of the census of 2000, there were 2,642 people, 819 households, and 538 families living in the city. The racial makeup of the city was 95.42% White, 1.51% African American, 0.76% Native American, 0.68% Asian, 0.72% from other races, and 0.91% from two or more races. Hispanic or Latino of any race were 1.74% of the population.

There were 819 households, out of which 29.9% had children under the age of 18 living with them, 55.3% were married couples living together, 8.1% had a female householder with no husband present, and 34.2% were non-families. 32.0% of all households were made up of individuals, and 17.2% had someone living alone who was 65 years of age or older. The average household size was 2.34 and the average family size was 2.94.

In the city, the population was spread out, with 19.4% under the age of 18, 32.9% from 18 to 24, 17.3% from 25 to 44, 16.8% from 45 to 64, and 13.5% who were 65 years of age or older. The median age was 23 years. For every 100 females, there were 84.9 males. For every 100 females age 18 and over, there were 77.3 males.

The median income for a household in the city was $35,282, and the median income for a family was $40,739. Males had a median income of $32,381 versus $17,423 for females. The per capita income for the city was $13,229. About 8.7% of families and 11.9% of the population were below the poverty line, including 14.1% of those under age 18 and 8.1% of those age 65 or over.

Economy
Jacam, a chemical manufacturer serving the oil and gas industry, is the largest employer in Sterling.

Education

Primary and secondary education
The community is served by Sterling USD 376 public school district.  The district has three schools in Sterling:
 Sterling High School, 308 East Washington Avenue, Grades 9 to 12.
 Sterling Junior High School, 412 North 5th Street, Grades 7 to 8.
 Sterling Grade School, 218 South 5th Street, Grades K to 6.

College 
Sterling College is a four-year institution formerly affiliated with the [Presbyterian Church USA].  The college is one of the largest employers in the city of Sterling.  The Sterling Warriors play home football games at Smisor Stadium and their home basketball games in the Clair L. Gleason PE Center on the Lonnie Kruse Court.

Infrastructure

Transportation

Highway
K-96 / K-14 state highway passes through Sterling.  KDOT has proposed converting K-96 into a 4-lane highway and bypass the cities of Nickerson and Sterling.  Numerous routes have been studied.

Rail
The Kansas and Oklahoma Railroad passes through the city.

Notable people

 Doris Fleeson, syndicated journalist, born in Sterling
 Nicolle Galyon, songwriter/singer, won AMC and CMA, raised in Sterling
 Lorene Harrison, musician, educator, born in Sterling
 Martin Pence, United States District Court judge, born in Sterling
 Richard G. Weede, United States Marine Corps General, born in Sterling

See also
 National Register of Historic Places listings in Rice County, Kansas
 Main Street Programs in the United States

References

Further reading

External links

 
 Sterling - Directory of Public Officials
 , from Hatteberg's People on KAKE TV news
 Sterling city map, KDOT

Cities in Rice County, Kansas
Cities in Kansas